The 2012–13 GlobalPort Batang Pier season was the franchise's first season in the Philippine Basketball Association (PBA). The team took over the Powerade Tigers after its sale to Sultan 900 Capital. Although it did not qualify for the Philippine or Commissioner's Cups, it was a quarterfinalist for the Governors' Cup.

Key dates
July 30: Coca-Cola Bottlers Philippines, owner of the Powerade Tigers, sent a letter to the PBA Commissioner's office informing it that the franchise would be sold to Sultan 900 Capital (owned by businessman Mikee Romero) for PHP100 million, with an additional PHP10 million franchise-application fee to the PBA. Under league rules, the sale required approval by two-thirds of the PBA board of governors. The board unanimously approved the purchase at a special board meeting August 17, and the team's name changed to GlobalPort Batang Pier.
August 17:  After the sale's approval, coach Bo Perasol asked to be released from his contract and Glenn Capacio was appointed interim coach.
August 19: The 2012 PBA Draft took place at Robinson's Midtown Mall in Manila.
January 3: Junel Baculi was appointed head coach, with Glenn Capacio assistant coach.

Draft picks

Roster

Philippine Cup

Eliminations

Standings

Game log

|- bgcolor="#edbebf" 
| 1
|  September 30
|  Barangay Ginebra
|  90–110
|  Miller (26)
|  Deutchman (6)
|  Miller (5)
|  Smart Araneta Coliseum
|  0–1
|  Boxscore
|- bgcolor="#edbebf" 
| 2
|  October 7
|  Air21
|  81–88
|  Miller (22)
|  Salvador (8)
|  Mandani (5)
|  Smart Araneta Coliseum
|  0–2
|  Boxscore
|- bgcolor="#edbebf" 
| 3
|  October 12
|  Talk 'N Text
|  103–108
|  Miller (22)
|  Miller, Salvador (7)
|  Miller (9)
|  Smart Araneta Coliseum
|  0–3
|  Boxscore
|- bgcolor="#bbffbb" 
| 4
|  October 17
|  Meralco
|  105–104
|  Miller (33)
|  Miller (11)
|  Mandani, Salvador (4)
|  Mall of Asia Arena
|  1–3
|  Boxscore
|- bgcolor="#edbebf" 
| 5
|  October 20
|  Rain or Shine
|  83–94
|  Deutchman (18)
|  Miller (11)
|  Mandani (6)
|  Ynares Center
|  1–4
|  Boxscore
|- bgcolor="#edbebf" 
| 6
|  October 26
|  Petron Blaze
|  98–110
|  Manuel (23)
|  Manuel (10)
|  Miller (7)
|  Smart Araneta Coliseum
|  1–5
|  Boxscore
|- bgcolor="#edbebf" 
| 7
|  October 31
|  San Mig Coffee
|  78–82
|  Miller (19)
|  Miller, Manuel (10)
|  Miller (5)
|  Smart Araneta Coliseum
|  1–6
|  Boxscore

|- bgcolor="#edbebf" 
| 8
|  November 4
|  Barako Bull
|  95–94
|  Yee (20)
|  Yee (7)
|  Miller (8)
|  Smart Araneta Coliseum
|  1–7
|  Boxscore
|- bgcolor="#edbebf" 
| 9
|  November 9
|  Barangay Ginebra
|  79–81
|  David (27)
|  Deutchman (10)
|  Vergara (9)
|  Cuneta Astrodome
|  1–8
|  Boxscore
|- bgcolor="#edbebf" 
| 10
|  November 18
|  Petron Blaze
|  81–110
|  Guevarra (14)
|  Hussaini, Salvador (6)
|  David, Hussaini, Antonio, Miller (2)
|  Smart Araneta Coliseum
|  1–9
|  Boxscore
|- bgcolor="#edbebf" 
| 11
|  November 23
|  Meralco
|  92–101
|  David (33)
|  Salvador (16)
|  Miller (14)
|  Smart Araneta Coliseum
|  1–10
|  Boxscore

|- bgcolor="#edbebf" 
| 12
|  December 1
|  Alaska
|  95–101
|  Miller (22)
|  Salvador (10)
|  Miller (6)
|  Dipolog
|  1–11
|  Boxscore
|- bgcolor="#edbebf" 
| 13
|  December 5
|  Air21
|  92–113
|  Hussaini (20)
|  Manuel (9)
|  Miller (6) 
|  Smart Araneta Coliseum
|  1–12
|  Boxscore
|- bgcolor="#edbebf" 
| 14
|  December 7
|  San Mig Coffee
|  96–107
|  David (22)
|  Deutchman, Salvador, Miller (8)
|  Miller (7) 
|  Mall of Asia Arena
|  1–13
|  Boxscore

Commissioner's Cup

Eliminations

Standings

Game log

|- bgcolor="#bbffbb" 
| 1
|  February 8
|  Petron Blaze
|  94–92
|  David (28)
|  Williams (15)
|  Mercado (11)
|  Smart Araneta Coliseum
|  1–0
|  boxscore
|- bgcolor="#edbebf" 
| 2
|  February 10
|  Barako Bull
|  88–98 (OT)
|  Aguilar (23)
|  Williams (27)
|  Mercado (16)
|  Smart Araneta Coliseum
|  1–1
|  boxscore
|- bgcolor="#bbffbb" 
| 3
|  February 15
|  Barangay Ginebra
|  89–80
|  Williams (23)
|  Williams (23)
|  Mercado (13)
|  Smart Araneta Coliseum
|  2–1
|  boxscore
|- bgcolor="#edbebf" 
| 4
|  February 20
|  Talk 'N Text
|  79–99
|  Williams, David (19)
|  Williams (15)
|  Mercado (4)
|  Smart Araneta Coliseum
|  2–2
|  boxscore
|- bgcolor="#edbebf" 
| 5
|  February 24
|  Meralco
|  89–90
|  David (27)
|  Williams (13)
|  Mercado (9)
|  Smart Araneta Coliseum
|  2–3
|  boxscore
{{PBA game log section|GlobalPort Batang Pier|March|show=yes|bgcolor=#ADFF2F|color=white
|- bgcolor="#edbebf" 
| 6
|  March 2
|  San Mig Coffee
|  84–91
|  David (27)
|  Williams (23)
|  Mercado (6)
|  Naga, Camarines Sur
|  2–4
|  boxscore
|- bgcolor="#edbebf" 
| 7
|  March 8
|  Rain or Shine
|  95–103
|  David (23)
|  Aguilar, Williams (10)
|  Mercado (8)
|  Smart Araneta Coliseum
|  2–5
|  boxscore
|- bgcolor="#edbebf" 
| 8
|  March 10
|  Air21
|  94–106
|  Sharpe (24)
|  Sharpe (9)
|  Mercado (6)
|  Smart Araneta Coliseum
|  2–6
|  boxscore
|- 
| 9
|  March 17
|  Alaska
|  
|  
|  
|  
|  Smart Araneta Coliseum
|  
|

Governors' Cup

Eliminations

Standings

Game log

Transactions

Trades

Pre-season

Commissioner's Cup

Governors' Cup

Recruited imports

References

NorthPort Batang Pier seasons
GlobalPort